This article lists the fixtures of the group stage for the 2018 Thomas Cup in Bangkok, Thailand.

All times Thailand Standard Time (UTC+07:00)

Group A

Teams

Standings

Matches

India vs France

China vs Australia

China vs France

India vs Australia

China vs India

France vs Australia

Group B

Teams

Standings

Matches

Indonesia vs Canada

Korea vs Thailand

Korea vs Canada

Indonesia vs Thailand

Indonesia vs Korea

Thailand vs Canada

Group C

Teams

Standings

Matches

Japan vs Hong Kong

Chinese Taipei vs Germany

Japan vs Germany

Chinese Taipei vs Hong Kong

Chinese Taipei vs Japan

Hong Kong vs Germany

Group D

Teams

Standings

Matches

Malaysia vs Russia

Denmark vs Algeria

Denmark vs Russia

Malaysia vs Algeria

Denmark vs Malaysia

Russia vs Algeria

References

Thomas Group stage